Jake John Hughes (born 30 May 1994) is a British racing driver currently competing in Formula E with McLaren. He is the winner of the inaugural BRDC Formula 4 Championship and has won multiple races at Formula 3.

Early racing career

Karting 
Hughes started his racing career in karting in 2010 at the age of sixteen, finishing eleventh in the Junior Class of the Easykart UK Championship. In 2011, he finished fifth in the Super 1 National Formula KGP Championship. He stayed in the same championship for 2012, improving to fourth in the series standings, whilst also winning the Easykart UK Championship in the Light category.

Local championships 
Hughes made his single-seaters debut in 2012 at Silverstone in the Formula Renault BARC Championship with Antel Motorsport and contested in the Rockingham round of the Formula Renault BARC Winter Series.

For 2013, he decided to move in the newly created BRDC Formula 4 Championship, joining Lanan Racing to partner Daniel Headlam. He took four wins with another six podiums to clinch the championship title, beating Seb Morris by 35 points.

As a reward for his title, Hughes tested a Dallara F308 for Carlin at the Circuit Ricardo Tormo, which he called "one of the best experiences in [his] life".

Formula Renault 

Hughes returned in the Formula Renault machinery with Formula Renault 2.0 Northern European Cup switch in 2014. He had only one podium, finishing third at Silverstone on his route to the eighth in the series standings. Also in 2014 he had part-time campaigns in Eurocup Formula Renault 2.0 and Formula Renault 2.0 Alps.

For 2015 he signed with Koiranen GP to contest full-time both in the Eurocup Formula Renault 2.0 and Formula Renault 2.0 Alps. He was victorious only in the second race at Spa and had another four podiums, finishing sixth in the championship. Though in the Alps championship he was more successful, winning races at Spa, Monza and Misano and taking the lead of the championship before the final round. However, due to two finishes outside of the podium places in that final event Hughes lost out on the title to Jack Aitken by just five points. In a podcast with Dan Ticktum six years later, Hughes revealed that he had competed in the final round with a cracked chassis, which had cost him performance throughout the weekend.

GP3 Series 
Hughes graduated to the GP3 Series in 2016, joining newcomers DAMS. He earned his first GP3 victory in the sprint race at Hockenheim. At the final round of the season in Abu Dhabi, Hughes experienced a technical failure in qualifying and was forced to start from the pitlane in the feature race. Having climbed up to seventh by the end of race 1, the Brit won the second race of the weekend, which he later described as "one of [his] best [race] weekends".

Hughes returned to the GP3 Series for 2018, after a one-year absence which he spent in the FIA Formula 3 European Championship. He raced for ART Grand Prix alongside Nikita Mazepin and his friends Callum Ilott and Anthoine Hubert. He claimed his first and only win of the year in the second race at the Red Bull Ring and ended up eighth in the standings, whilst his teammates locked out the first three positions in the standings.

Formula 3

FIA F3 European Championship 
For 2017, Hughes made the switch from the GP3 Series to the FIA Formula 3 European Championship, having competed in the final round of the 2016 season. He contested the season with the Hitech GP team. He claimed his first and only win at the second race in Nürburgring and finished the season 5th in the driver's championship.

FIA Formula 3 Championship

2019 

Hughes continued in the third tier of single-seater racing, as the GP3 Series rebranded to become the FIA Formula 3 Championship. Hughes joined the new HWA Racelab outfit alongside Keyvan Andres and Bent Viscaal. Hughes claimed his only win of the year in a fortuitous sprint race at the Red Bull Ring, as race leaders Robert Shwartzman and Marcus Armstrong collided on the final lap. Shwartzman crossed the line first, but was given a penalty for causing the collision, handing the win to Hughes. Hughes claimed a double podium finish at the Hungaroring, finishing both races in third place. Hughes scored 90 of his team's 100 points over the season, placing him seventh in the drivers' championship.

2020 
Hughes was retained by HWA Racelab for the 2020 season and was joined by Ferrari junior Enzo Fittipaldi and Red Bull junior Jack Doohan. Hughes experienced a poor start to the season, collecting only half a point from the first six races. He was on course for a top-two finish in the sprint race at the second Red Bull Ring round, but collided with Liam Lawson and suffered race-ending damage. He took his first podium of the year in the feature race at the second Silverstone round, followed by his first Formula 3 feature race victory in Barcelona the following week. Hughes claimed his second win of the year at the Monza sprint race. He ended the season seventh in the championship for a second consecutive year, scoring 111.5 of his team's 138.5 points.

2021 
Shortly prior to the final round of the 2020 championship, Hughes announced that he would leave the series at the end of the year, having spent five years racing at Formula 3 level. However, in 2021, Hughes returned to the championship at the fourth round at the Hungaroring as a substitute driver, replacing the injured Kaylen Frederick at Carlin Buzz Racing. He finished the races in 16th, 17th and 13th respectively.

At the end of the year, Hughes tested a Mercedes-AMG GT3 Evo for Team HRT, driving alongside Lirim Zendeli, David Beckmann and David Schumacher at the Circuit Paul Ricard.

FIA Formula 2 Championship

2020 & 2021: Partial campaigns 
On 22 September 2020 it was announced that Jake Hughes would step up to Formula 2, replacing Giuliano Alesi at the BWT HWA Racelab team for the 10th round at the Sochi Autodrom. Hughes finished 12th on his feature race debut, but was eliminated from the sprint race after a first-lap collision with Guilherme Samaia. Hughes was replaced by former FIA Formula 3 competitor Théo Pourchaire for the final two rounds in Bahrain.

Before the fifth round of the 2021 season, held at Monza, Hughes was confirmed to once again be stepping in at HWA, this time due to an injury sustained by regular driver Jack Aitken at the 24 Hours of Spa. In the first race, which was plagued by retirements from numerous other drivers, Hughes managed to finish twelfth, having started from the pit lane after stalling on the formation lap. He had to retire from the second race after a collision with his teammate Alessio Deledda. In the third race of the weekend Hughes finished 13th. The following round at Sochi, Hughes went on to score his first points in Formula 2, finishing fourth in the sprint race. This also gave HWA their best ever race finish in the series to date.

2022 

After testing with new team Van Amersfoort Racing at the post-season test at Yas Marina, Hughes signed up with the team for the 2022 Formula 2 season, partnering Belgian Amaury Cordeel. Having started his season off with points at Bahrain, Hughes finished third in the Jeddah sprint race but was later disqualified for a technical infringement. Despite this disappointment, he would bounce back the following day, taking fourth place in the feature race. However, the following three rounds formed a points scoring drought, which was compounded by a crash during qualifying in Monaco and a subsequent stall at the start of the sprint race, which he began from pole. The Briton returned to the top ten in Baku, scoring a point on Sunday, before another tenth place at his home track of Silverstone. One week later in Austria, Hughes took a fifth place in a chaotic feature race, which would end up being his final points of the season, as Hughes would miss the French and Hungarian rounds after testing positive for COVID-19, being replaced by David Beckmann. Due to growing Formula E commitments, Hughes left VAR fully before the round at Spa-Francorchamps. He ended up 16th in the standings, outscoring teammate Cordeel, who had competed throughout the entire season.

Formula E 
Hughes made his first Formula E appearance during the 2019 rookie test in Marrakech, where he partnered Jamie Chadwick at Nio Formula E Team. The following year, he would once again appear in the rookie test at the same circuit, this time driving for Mercedes-Benz EQ Formula E Team alongside Daniel Juncadella.

On 25 February 2021 it was announced that Jake Hughes would be the reserve driver for Venturi Racing in the 2020–21 Formula E World Championship. After deputising for Gary Paffett at Mercedes-EQ Formula E Team in the last rounds of the season, he was signed as the team's full-time reserve and development driver for the 2021–22 season.

NEOM McLaren Formula E Team (2023–)

2022-23 season 
After it was announced that the Mercedes-EQ Formula E Team, for which Hughes had been a simulator driver, would be taken over by the McLaren Formula E Team, the Briton left Formula 2 in pursuit of taking one of the seats for the upcoming season. In November 2022, Hughes joined McLaren for the 2022–23 season, partnering René Rast. The season started out strongly in Mexico City, as Hughes progressed to the semi-final stage in qualifying, ending up third on the grid before finishing the race in fifth place, having been overtaken by André Lotterer on the final lap. Following the conclusion to the race, Hughes branded the ePrix as the "hardest race [he'd] ever done". At the first round of the Diriyah ePrix, Hughes qualified at second place (missing out on pole position by 0.060s) but finished the race in eighth. More qualifying success followed in the second round, as Hughes took his first pole position in the series, beating Mitch Evans in the final. He ended the race in fifth position, having lost the lead to Evans at the start.

Personal life 
Hughes was born in Birmingham, England and is a supporter of Aston Villa FC.

He was a co-host of the H.Y.M podcast, alongside BMW factory driver Nick Yelloly and Superbike racer Alex Murley, where the three interviewed notable motorsport personalities, such as Seb Morris, Sheldon van der Linde, Jordan King and Dan Ticktum.

Karting record

Karting career summary

Racing record

Racing career summary 

† As Hughes was a guest driver, he was ineligible for championship points.
* Season still in progress.

Complete BRDC Formula 4 Championship results 
(key) (Races in bold indicate pole position) (Races in italics indicate points for the fastest lap of top ten finishers)

Complete Formula Renault 2.0 Northern European Cup results 
(key) (Races in bold indicate pole position; races in italics indicate fastest lap)

Complete Formula Renault Eurocup results 
(key) (Races in bold indicate pole position; races in italics indicate fastest lap)

† As Hughes was a guest driver, he was ineligible for points.

Complete Formula Renault 2.0 Alps Series results 
(key) (Races in bold indicate pole position) (Races in italics indicate fastest lap)

Complete GP3 Series results 
(key) (Races in bold indicate pole position) (Races in italics indicate fastest lap)

Complete FIA Formula 3 European Championship results 
(key) (Races in bold indicate pole position) (Races in italics indicate fastest lap)

Complete Macau Grand Prix results

Complete F3 Asian Championship results 
(key) (Races in bold indicate pole position) (Races in italics indicate fastest lap)

Complete FIA Formula 3 Championship results 
(key) (Races in bold indicate pole position; races in italics indicate points for the fastest lap of top ten finishers)

‡ Half points awarded as less than 75% of race distance was completed.

Complete FIA Formula 2 Championship results 
(key) (Races in bold indicate pole position) (Races in italics indicate points for the fastest lap of top ten finishers)

Complete Formula E results
(key) (Races in bold indicate pole position; races in italics indicate fastest lap)

References

External links 

1994 births
Living people
Sportspeople from Birmingham, West Midlands
English racing drivers
BRDC British Formula 3 Championship drivers
Formula Renault 2.0 NEC drivers
Formula Renault Eurocup drivers
Formula Renault 2.0 Alps drivers
GP3 Series drivers
FIA Formula 3 Championship drivers
FIA Formula 2 Championship drivers
Formula Regional European Championship drivers
F3 Asian Championship drivers
Strakka Racing drivers
Koiranen GP drivers
DAMS drivers
Carlin racing drivers
Hitech Grand Prix drivers
ART Grand Prix drivers
HWA Team drivers
Van Amersfoort Racing drivers
KIC Motorsport drivers
Mark Burdett Motorsport drivers
Formula Renault BARC drivers
R-ace GP drivers
Formula E drivers
McLaren Racing drivers